Morindone is an anthraquinone compound obtained from various Morinda species, especially M. tinctoria, but also M. citrifolia. Its principal use is as a dye, but it has also been investigated for anticancer and microbial uses.

Preparation 
Morindone is obtained from the root bark of M. tinctoria or related species in two stages. In the first step, small roots of immature plants are boiled in alcohol to obtain morindin, a yellowish substance which can also be used in dyeing. Further heating brings about hydrolysis of two glucose monomers through sublimation, leaving intensely red crystals.

M. tinctoria is extensively grown in India for commercial production. Moridin content in the roots peaks in two to three years and drops off considerably after that; some attempts have been made to speed up production using tissue cultures.

Use as a dye
Morindone requires a mordant, and the color obtained varies depending on the substance used. Aluminum mordants give a red color, while iron and chromium produce duskier shades. The traditional mordant used in Java, jirak bark (Symplocos fasciculata), is rich in aluminum salts.

Compared to modern dyestuffs, morindone is not as fast or as stable. Since it can be readily cultivated, however, interest in it remains high. Recent research has examined cell culture as a means of increasing yields.

References 

 Note that the chemical formula given here is incorrect; this reference was used only for physical properties and preparation of substance.

Natural dyes
Anthraquinone dyes
Catechols
Trihydroxyanthraquinones